Charles Radcliffe (7 December 1941 – 10 July 2021) was an English cultural critic, political activist and theorist known for his association with the Situationist movement.

Life
A member of the direct-action wing of the peace movement of the early 1960s, he became a regular contributor to the anarchist press in Britain and in 1966 launched Heatwave, a radical magazine produced in London. It lasted for just two issues, but was cited in the Situationist tract On the Poverty of Student Life as an example of one of the "profoundly revolutionary tendencies in the critique of all aspects of the prevailing way of life." Its treatment of popular culture has since been hailed as path-breaking: the critic Jon Savage has said that one piece by Radcliffe "laid the foundation for the next 20 years of sub-cultural theory."

Heatwave was closely associated with Rebel Worker, a short-lived but influential magazine published in Chicago by Franklin Rosemont, Penelope Rosemont, and Bernard Marszalek, to which Radcliffe was a contributor. They were members of the Industrial Workers of the World with links to the Surrealist movement in France, the British libertarian socialist group Solidarity and the Situationist International.

Radcliffe became a member of the English section of the S.I. in December 1966, alongside Chris Gray (situationist), Donald Nicholson-Smith and T. J. Clark. He resigned in November 1967, and Gray, Nicholson-Smith and Clark were expelled shortly thereafter.

Between early 1970 and summer 1972 Radcliffe was involved with the magazine Friends, sharing a flat with its editor, Alan Marcuson.

Radcliffe is a descendant of Moll Davis.

See also 
Chicago Surrealist Group

Further reading 
Rosemont, Franklin and Radcliffe, Charles. Dancin' in the Streets: Anarchists, IWWs, Surrealists, Situationists and Provos in the 1960s as Recorded in the Pages of Rebel Worker and Heatwave. Charles H Kerr. 2005.

References

External links 
Articles on and by Charles Radcliffe and comrades

1941 births
2021 deaths
People from Belfast
Industrial Workers of the World members
Situationists
Political philosophers
British political activists